Front-end loading (FEL), also referred to as pre-project planning (PPP), front-end engineering design (FEED), feasibility analysis, conceptual planning, programming/schematic design and early project planning, is the process for conceptual development of projects in processing industries such as upstream oil and gas, petrochemical, natural gas refining, extractive metallurgy, waste-to-energy, and pharmaceuticals. This involves developing sufficient strategic information with which owners can address risk and make decisions to commit resources in order to maximize the potential for success.

Front-end loading includes robust planning and design early in a project's lifecycle (i.e., the front end of a project), at a time when the ability to influence changes in design is relatively high and the cost to make those changes is relatively low.  It typically applies to industries with highly capital intensive, long lifecycle projects (i.e., hundreds of millions or billions of dollars over several years before any revenue is produced).  Though it often adds a small amount of time and cost to the early portion of a project, these costs are minor compared to the alternative of the costs and effort required to make changes at a later stage in the project.

It also typically uses a stage-gate process, whereby a project must pass through formal gates at well defined milestones within the project's lifecycle before receiving funding to proceed to the next stage of work. The quality of front-end planning can be improved through the use of  PDRI (Project Definition Rating Index) as a part of the stage-gate process.

Front-end loading is usually followed by detailed design or detailed engineering.

FEL Stages 
It is common industry practice to divide front-end-loading activities into three stages: FEL-1, FEL-2, and FEL-3. For each stage, typical deliverables are listed given below :

Another FEL methodology splits the project into four phases:
 FEL-1: Options Study or Index Engineering. This answers the question, "what are my options to achieve my project goals?". For example, in the processing of nickel laterite ore, it might be possible to build either a pyrometallurgical or hydrometallurgical processing plant. This stage would study both options and recommend the best one based on the specific project requirements. 
 Gate 1: Option Selection. The project owner selects which FEL1 option will be developed further, based on input from their engineers. 
 FEL-2: Feasibility Study or Conceptual Engineering. The selected option is developed up to a pre-defined level of detail not yet sufficient for construction and operation, but enough to develop a cost estimate, a schedule estimate, and to make any critical decisions that will influence the final design of the plant. 
 Gate 2: Approval for Basic Engineering. Based on the conceptual design and cost and schedule estimates, the project owner will decide whether or not to proceed with the plant. 
 FEL-3: FEED (Front-End Engineering Design) or Basic Engineering. The engineering team will now fully design the plant, including the exact specifications for how it will be constructed, commissioned, started up, and operated. The proposed plant will now have a detailed cost estimate and construction schedule.
 Gate 3: Approval for Construction. The project owner will give their approval for building the plant as designed by their engineers. 
 Project Execution and Detailed Engineering. Materials procurement and construction will begin. This stage includes all activities until the plant is started-up and regular operations begin.

Notes

External links
 The Construction Industry Institute is a process-industry consortium with information and training on pre-project planning.
 SAVE International  - American Society of Value Engineering

Project management